Flexx is a Swedish eurodance group, formed in 1993 by Swedish rappers Chris Ljung and Malvern Mandengu.

History
In 1993, Chris Ljung and Malvern Mandengu recorded the single "Wake Up", which became a hit (at least in Sweden).
The producers were Jan Nordlund and Johan Lagerlöf. The vocalist attracted Nana Hedin (known for the female vocal parts of E-Type). In 1994, they released 3 singles: "Flexxible", "The Good, The Bad And The Ugly" and "Runner-Up". In the same year, an album Flexxibility was released. In most of the compositions, female vocals belong to Kajsa Mellgren. Kajsa left the Flexx team in 1995. Instead, they took the performer Silver. Flexx was planning a new album Generation XX, but it never appeared.

Discography

Album
 Flexxibility (1994, Stockholm Records) — 36 in Sweden album chart (week 23, 1994)

Singles
The group had 6 singles in Swedish national music chart:

 "Wake Up" (1993) — best position 4 (week 6, 1994)
 "Flexxible" (1994) — best position 11 (week 18, 1994)
 "The Good, The Bad And The Ugly" (1994) — best position 17 (week 18, 1994)
 "Runner-Up" (1994) — best position 38 (week 48, 1994)
"Spider" (1995)
"Shake U All" (1996)

References

External links 
 Flexx on the Eurodance Encyclopedia

Swedish musical groups
Swedish Eurodance groups